In medicine, a vegetation is an abnormal growth named for its similarity to natural vegetation. Vegetations are often associated with endocarditis. They can be made of fibrin and platelets.

Types
Certain conditions are associated with specific vegetation patterns:

References

Medical terminology